Charles Marvin "Chuck" Dalfen (February 23, 1943 – May 26, 2009) was the chairperson of the Canadian Radio-television and Telecommunications Commission (CRTC) serving from January 1, 2002 to the end of his term on December 31, 2006.

Born in Montreal, Quebec, he received a Bachelor of Arts degree in 1964 from McGill University, a Bachelor of Philosophy degree from the University of Oxford in 1964, and a law degree from the University of Ottawa in 1969. He was called to the Quebec Bar in 1970.

From 1967 to 1972, he was an Assistant and Associate Professor at Carleton University. From 1969 to 1972, he was a legal advisor for the Government of Canada's Department of Communications working, as Gordon Boisseau, under the direction of Gilles Bergeron. From 1972 to 1974, he was a Professor of Law at the University of Toronto. From 1974 to 1976, he was the Deputy Minister of Transport and Communications. From 1976 to 1980, he was the Vice-Chairman, Telecommunications of the CRTC. He then worked with Johnston and Buchan until 1999 when he returned became a partner at Torys LLP, an international law firm and served as Chairperson of its Communications Law Group in which he advised both Canadian and foreign clients in domestic and international legal issues related to radio, television, cable TV, satellite, wireless and new media. From 2002-2007, he served as Chairman of the CRTC. Following the end of his term at the CRTC, Dalfen served as counsel at Torys LLP.

He also wrote and spoke about communications policy and law and was involved with ITU, Intelsat and the UN Committee on Direct Broadcast Satellites.

He died on May 26, 2009 from a heart attack. He was buried May 28, 2009 at the Jewish Memorial Gardens in Osgoode, Ontario.

References

1943 births
2009 deaths
Alumni of the University of Oxford
Chairpersons of the Canadian Radio-television and Telecommunications Commission
20th-century Canadian civil servants
Jews from Quebec
Lawyers from Montreal
Canadian legal scholars
McGill University alumni
University of Ottawa alumni
Academic staff of the University of Toronto
Academic staff of the University of Toronto Faculty of Law